1023 Thomana, provisional designation , is a rare-type carbonaceous background asteroid from the outer regions of the asteroid belt, approximately 58 kilometers in diameter. It was discovered on 25 June 1924, by German astronomer Karl Reinmuth at Heidelberg Observatory in southwest Germany. The asteroid was named after the St. Thomas Choir of Leipzig.

Classification and orbit 

Thomana orbits the Sun in the outer main-belt at a distance of 2.8–3.5 AU once every 5 years and 8 months (2,058 days). Its orbit has an eccentricity of 0.10 and an inclination of 10° with respect to the ecliptic. The asteroid's observation arc begins at Heidelberg, one night after its official discovery observation.

Physical characteristics 

In the Tholen classification, Thomana is an uncommon carbonaceous G-type asteroid.

Rotation period 

Between 2006 and 2009, three rotational lightcurves of Thomana were obtained from photometric observations by astronomers James W. Brinsfield, Pierre Antonini as well as René Roy and Laurent Bernasconi. Lightcurve analysis gave a concurring rotation period of 17.56 hours with a brightness variation between 0.27 and 0.36 magnitude.

Spin axis 

In 2016, an international study modeled a lightcurve from various data sources with a period of 17.5611 hours and found two  spin axis of (86.0°, −65.0°) and (272.0°, −42.0°), respectively, in ecliptic coordinates (λ, β).

Diameter and albedo 

According to the surveys carried out by the Infrared Astronomical Satellite IRAS, the Japanese Akari satellite, and NASA's Wide-field Infrared Survey Explorer with its subsequent NEOWISE mission, Thomana measures between 53.28 and 61.34 kilometers in diameter and its surface has an albedo between 0.05 and 0.065. The Collaborative Asteroid Lightcurve Link adopts the results obtained by IRAS, that is an albedo of 0.0649 and a diameter of 58.27 kilometers based on an absolute magnitude of 9.76.

Naming 

This minor planet was named by the discoverer after the St. Thomas Choir of Leipzig ("Thomanerchor"), a boys' choir at St. Thomas Church in Leipzig, Germany, where Johann Sebastian Bach used to work as music director. The official naming citation was published by Paul Herget in The Names of the Minor Planets in 1955.

References

External links 
 Asteroid Lightcurve Database (LCDB), query form (info )
 Dictionary of Minor Planet Names, Google books
 Asteroids and comets rotation curves, CdR – Geneva Observatory, Raoul Behrend
 Discovery Circumstances: Numbered Minor Planets (1)-(5000) – Minor Planet Center
 
 

001023
Discoveries by Karl Wilhelm Reinmuth
Named minor planets
001023
19240625